Rollin Edward Cook (October 5, 1890 – August 11, 1975) was a Major League Baseball pitcher who played for the St. Louis Browns in .

External links
Baseball Reference.com

1890 births
1975 deaths
St. Louis Browns players
Major League Baseball pitchers
Baseball players from Ohio
Toronto Maple Leafs (International League) players